Strength athletics in the United States refers to the various strongman events throughout United States and North America in the sport of strength athletics in association with the World's Strongest Man ("WSM") contest. America has both an amateur and a professional sanctioning body.

Pro/Amateur organizations
American Strongman Corporation ("ASC") is the sole sanctioning body for all professional American strength athletes and organizes the annual America's Strongest Man contest, as well as the NAS US Amateur National Championships, the winner of which receives their pro card to compete in professional contests. North American Strongman ("NASM") organizes the majority of the amateur contests in the United States, and holds pro qualifier events and national championship events throughout the year with men's, woman's, teen's and master's divisions as well as lightweight and heavyweight classes similar to ASC.

United States Strongman  is a relatively new organization.

America's Strongest Man

America's Strongest Man is an annual strongman competition held in the United States and featuring only American athletes. The contest was established in 1997, with Mark Philippi winning the inaugural contest.

Official results - top three places

Repeat champions

North America's Strongest Man

North America's Strongest Man is an annual strongman competition consisting of athletes from both United States and Canada. The event was established in 1992.

Official results - top three places

Results courtesy of David Horne's World of Grip: http://www.davidhorne-gripmaster.com/strongmanresults.html

NAS US Amateur Strongman Championships
The Amateur US Nationals were created in 1997 and are held annually in various locations throughout the United States, with the winner of each weight class earning their pro card to compete professionally. Traditionally, the winner of the men's heavyweight class will go on to compete in major national and international strongman contests such as the World's Strongest Man and the Arnold Strongman Classic.

Men's Heavyweight Champions

References

Strongmen competitions
United States